Smile is the ninth album by L'Arc-en-Ciel, released on March 31, 2004. It was the band's first original studio album after a prolonged hiatus. Smile was later given a United States release by Tofu Records, for which all Japanese song titles received English translations. The song "Ready Steady Go" was used as the second opening for the Fullmetal Alchemist anime.

Track listing

Personnel
 hyde – vocals, acoustic guitar on track 10
 ken – guitar, backing vocals, keyboards on tracks 1, 2, 4, 5, 6, 7, 9 and 10, lap steel guitar on track 10
 tetsu – bass guitar, backing vocals, keyboards on tracks 2, 5 and 9, guitar solo on track 5
 yukihiro – drums, percussion, backing vocals, metal percussion on track 3
 Hajime Okano – keyboards on tracks 2, 4, 5, 9 and 10, backing vocals on track 8
 Hiroaki Sugawara – keyboards on track 6, synthesizer on track 10
 Asuka Kaneko – strings on track 6
 Jack Danger – backing vocals on track 8
 Hal-Oh Togashi – acoustic piano

2001 albums
L'Arc-en-Ciel albums
Tofu Records albums